Encore: Live and Direct and Encore: The Whole Story is a live album and a video release by German hard dance group Scooter released on 13 May 2002 chronicling the show of the band's Push the Beat for This Jam Tour which was held on 21 January 2002 in Cologne (Germany). The film was directed and produced by Paul Hauptmann.

Track listing

CD 
 "Posse (I Need You On The Floor)" – 5:03
 "We Bring The Noise" – 3:59
 "R U ☺?" – 5:25
 "Aiii Shot The DJ" – 3:27
 "Faster Harder Scooter" – 3:56
 "I'm Raving" – 4:04
 "Call Me Mañana" – 4:20
 "Fuck The Millenium" – 4:09
 "Am Fenster" – 6:01
 "Eyes Without A Face" – 3:44
 "No Fate" – 4:12
 "How Much Is The Fish?" – 6:52
 "The Logical Song" – 4:45
 "The Age Of Love" – 3:06
 "Fire" – 3:14
 "Endless Summer" – 3:23
 "Hyper Hyper" – 2:37
 "Nessaja" – 3:28 (Special Bonus Track - studio version)

DVD

DVD1: Live In Concert 
 "Posse (I Need You On The Floor)"
 "We Bring The Noise"
 "R U ☺?"
 "Aiii Shot The DJ"
 "Faster Harder Scooter"
 "I'm Raving"
 "Rhapsody In E"
 "Stuttgart"
 "Call Me Mañana"
 "Fuck The Millennium"
 "Habanera"
 "Am Fenster"
 "Eyes Without A Face"
 "No Fate"
 "How Much Is The Fish?"
 "The Logical Song"
 "The Age Of Love"
 "Fire"
 "Endless Summer"
 "Hyper Hyper"
 "Move Your Ass"

Extras:
 Alternate angles on selected live tracks
 Tour and backstage documentary
 Band's comments on live tracks

DVD2: The Videos 
 "Hyper Hyper"
 "Move Your Ass"
 "Friends"
 "Endless Summer"
 "Back In The UK"
 "Let Me Be Your Valentine"
 "Rebel Yell"
 "I'm Raving"
 "Break It Up"
 "Fire"
 "The Age Of Love"
 "No Fate"
 "How Much Is The Fish?"
 "We Are The Greatest"
 "I Was Made For Loving You"
 "Call Me Mañana"
 "Faster Harder Scooter"
 "Fuck The Millennium"
 "I'm Your Pusher"
 "She's The Sun"
 "Posse (I Need You On The Floor)"
 "Aiii Shot The DJ"
 "The Logical Song"
 "Nessaja"

Extras:
 Making ofs
 Discography
 Photo gallery
 Quiz

Personnel 
Credits adapted from Encore: The Whole Story liner notes.
H.P. Baxxter – vocals, MC lyrics, electric guitar, acoustic guitar, producer, performer, programmer
Rick J. Jordan – keyboards, acoustic guitar, mixer, engineer, producer, performer, programmer
Axel Coon – keyboards, producer, performer, programmer
Wenke Kleine-Benne - mixer, engineer

Charts

Certifications

References

External links 
 

Scooter (band) albums
2002 live albums
2002 video albums
Live video albums